Skornyakovo is a rural locality (a village) in Krasavinskoye Rural Settlement, Velikoustyugsky District, Vologda Oblast, Russia. The population was 52 as of 2002.

Geography 
Skornyakovo is located 27 km northeast of Veliky Ustyug (the district's administrative centre) by road. Bereznikovo is the nearest rural locality.

References 

Rural localities in Velikoustyugsky District